Liz McCarthy is an American mixed martial artist who competes in the Atomweight division. She is signed with Invicta FC. She competed at Invicta 2 and 4 with a win and a loss. She returned at Invicta FC 9 against Amber Brown where she lost via split decision.

Mixed martial arts record

|-
|Loss
| style="text-align:center;"|2–4
|Kyra Batara
|TKO (punches)
|Combate Americas: Road to the Championship 2
|
| style="text-align:center;"| 3
| style="text-align:center;"| 2:38
|Hollywood, California, United States
|
|-
|Loss
| style="text-align:center;"|2–3
|Jinh Yu Frey
|Decision (unanimous)
|Invicta FC 14: Evinger vs. Kianzad
|
| style="text-align:center;"| 3
| style="text-align:center;"| 5:00
|Kansas City, Missouri, United States
|
|-
|Loss
| style="text-align:center;"|2–2
|Amber Brown
|Decision (split)
|Invicta FC 9: Honchak vs. Hashi
|
| style="text-align:center;"| 3
| style="text-align:center;"| 5:00
|Davenport, Iowa, United States
|
|-
|Win
| style="text-align:center;"|2–1
|Cassie Robb
|Decision (unanimous)
|Intense Championship Fighting 13
|
| style="text-align:center;"| 3
| style="text-align:center;"| 5:00
|Great Falls, Montana, United States
|
|-
|Loss
| style="text-align:center;"|1–1
|Jodie Esquibel
|Decision (split)
|Invicta FC 4: Esparza vs. Hyatt
|
| style="text-align:center;"| 3
| style="text-align:center;"| 5:00
|Kansas City, Kansas, United States
|
|-
|Win
| style="text-align:center;"|1–0
|Jessica Phillipus
|TKO (doctor stoppage)
|Invicta FC 2: Baszler vs. McMann
|
| style="text-align:center;"| 1
| style="text-align:center;"| 5:00
|Kansas City, Kansas, United States
|
|}

References

External links

1986 births
Living people
American female mixed martial artists
Atomweight mixed martial artists
Mixed martial artists from Oregon
Sportspeople from Milwaukie, Oregon
21st-century American women